Boldione, also known as androstadienedione or 1-dehydroandrostenedione, as well as 1,4-androstadiene-3,17-dione, is an important industrial precursor for various steroid hormones.  In the United States the chemical is regulated as a Schedule III Controlled Substance.

Uses
Androstadienedione is an important industrial-scale precursor for a wide variety of steroid hormones within the estrane and androstane classifications.

Preparation
Androstadienedione is obtained in high yield from both plant and animal sterols by biotransformation. The chemical is a common byproduct derived from other processes (e.g. vegetable oil deodorization and the production of lanolin from wool processing). The product is produced in a single step via a simultaneous side-chain cleavage at the C17 position and an alcohol oxidation in the C3 position.

Regulation

United States
In 2004 the United States Congress passed the Anabolic Steroid Control Act of 2005 which placed 36 steroids and over-the-counter prohormones into schedule III of the Controlled Substances Act. In this legislation boldenone was classified as a controlled substance and boldione remained legal.  In April 2008 the United States Drug Enforcement Administration published an "Initial Notice of Proposed Rulemaking" concerning the scheduling of three anabolic substances: boldione, desoxymethyltestosterone, and dienedione.  In 2008, at the time of the proposal, these three substances were listed as ingredients in more than 58 dietary supplements which were available for purchase over the counter.  Effective January 4, 2010 these three chemicals, including boldione, were classified as Schedule III Controlled Substances and became illegal in the United States.

WADA
Boldione is on the World Anti-Doping Agency's list of prohibited substances, and is therefore banned from use in most major sports.

References 

Androgens and anabolic steroids
Androstanes
Diketones
World Anti-Doping Agency prohibited substances